{{DISPLAYTITLE:C19H22N2OS}}
The molecular formula C19H22N2OS (molar mass: 326.45 g/mol, exact mass: 326.1453 u) may refer to:

 Acepromazine, or acetylpromazine
 Aceprometazine
 Tiazesim, or thiazesim